In Buddhist tradition, Vipassī (Pāli) is the twenty-second of twenty-eight Buddhas described in Chapter 27 of the Buddhavaṃsa. The Buddhavamsa is a Buddhist text which describes the life of Gautama Buddha and the twenty-seven Buddhas who preceded him. It is the fourteenth book of the Khuddaka Nikāya, which in turn is part of the Sutta Piṭaka. The Sutta Piṭaka is one of three pitakas (main sections) which together constitute the Tripiṭaka, or Pāli Canon of Theravada Buddhism.

The third to the last Buddha of the Alamkarakalpa, Vipassī was preceded by Phussa Buddha and succeeded by Sikhī Buddha.

Etymology
The Pali word Vipassī has the Sanskrit form Vipaśyin. Vi (good) and passī (saw) together mean "having seen clearly". The word belongs to the same family as the term vipassanā (contemplation). This Buddha was so named because he had big eyes, clear vision both day and night, and his insight into perpetual complicated circumstances and very deep theories.

Biography
According to the Buddhavamsa, as well as traditional Buddhist legend and mythology, Vipassī lived 91 kalpas — many billions of years — before the present time. In Vipassī's time, the longevity of humans was 84,000 years.

Vipassī was born in Bandhumatī in Khema Park, in present-day India.His father was Bandhumā the warrior-chief, and his mother was Bandhumatī. His wife was Sutanu, and he had a son named Samavattakkhandha.

Vipassī lived as a householder for 8,000 years in the palaces of Nanda, Sunanda and Sirimā. Upon renouncing his worldly life, he rode out of the palace in a chariot. Vipassī practiced asceticism for eight months before attaining enlightenment under an Ajapāla nigrodha tree. Just prior to achieving buddhahood, he accepted a bowl of milk rice offered by Sudassana-setthi's daughter, and grass for his seat by a guard named Sujâta.

Sources differ as to how long Vipassī lived. He was reported to have died in Sumitta Park, at the age of either 80,000 or 100,000 years.

Physical characteristics

Teachings
Vipassī preached his first sermon in the Khamamigadâya to 6,800,000 disciples, his second sermon to 100,000 disciples, and his third sermon to 80,000 disciples.

His two foremost male disciples were Khanda and Tissa and his two foremost female disciples were Candâ and Candamittâ. Asoka was his personal assistant. His good donors were Punabbasummitta and Naga in the lay men, Sirimâ and Uttarâ in the lay women. Mendaki (then called Avaroja) built the Gandhakuti (scented pavilion) for him. He did the uposatha once every seven years, and the sangha observed the discipline perfectly.

See also
 Buddhist cosmology
 Glossary of Buddhism
 Longevity myths

Notes

Buddhas

ja:過去七仏